Bekwai is a town and the capital of the Bekwai Municipal, a municipality in the Ashanti Region of Ghana. Bekwai is the seventy-ninth most populous settlement in Ghana, with a population of 7,267 people. Bekwai and Bekwai Municipal are south of the Ashanti regional capital of Kumasi, north of Obuasi.

Telecommunication
There are 37 public payphones from a total of 5,000 telephone lines that are installed throughout the Bekwai Municipal District. Also, a post office has been established.

Healthcare and sanitation
There is also the state Bekwai Hospital. Bekwai is one of six municipalities in the Bekwai Municipal District in which tap water is generally available.

Education
Seventh Day Adventist Secondary School
wesley High Senior Secondary School
College Of Accountancy
St. John Senior High School

Train station
In Bekwai there is a train station.

See also 
 Railway stations in Ghana

References

External links 
 MSN Map

Populated places in the Ashanti Region